Skeleton Cave may refer to:

 Skeleton Cave (Arizona), U.S.
 Skeleton Cave (Oregon), U.S.
 Skeleton Cave (New South Wales), Australia